Syzygium corynanthum, commonly known as sour cherry and Killarney satinash, is a common Australian tree  which grows in surrounding areas from Taree, New South Wales (31 ° S) to tropical Queensland.The habitat of Syzygium corynanthum is rainforest on basaltic or fertile alluvial soils.

Description 
Syzygium corynanthum is a medium size tree, which can reach 30 metres in height and a 90 cm in trunk diameter. The tree's crown appears dark and full.

The bark is grey and scaly, with numerous depressions caused by the shedding of bark scales. Syzygium corynanthum are slightly buttressed at the base.

Leaves, flowers and fruit 

The leaves are opposite, simple and entire with numerous oil dots, about five diameters apart of different sizes. Leaf stalks are 6mm long. Flowers are in short dense panicles. Petals are cream, four in number and appear from April to July.

The fruit matures from September to December, being a red berry, broader towards the tip than at the base. Four persistent calyx lobes surround the base of the fruit, from which the style usually protrudes. The taste of the fruit is not particularly sour, as the common name might suggest.

Seed germination is slow, commencing at 40 days, and being complete after 200 days. Fruit is prone to insect attack. Soaking of the seeds is recommended to drown insect larvae. Fruit are eaten by many rainforest birds, including the wompoo fruit dove and catbird.

References

 Syzygium corynanthum at NSW Flora Online Retrieved on 2009-08-04

Myrtales of Australia
Trees of Australia
Flora of New South Wales
Flora of Queensland
corynanthum
Taxa named by Ferdinand von Mueller